

This is a list of the National Register of Historic Places listings in West Philadelphia.

This is intended to be a complete list of the properties and districts on the National Register of Historic Places in West Philadelphia, Pennsylvania, United States. The locations of National Register properties and districts for which the latitude and longitude coordinates are included below, may be seen in an online map.

There are 589 properties and districts listed on the National Register in Philadelphia, including 67 National Historic Landmarks. West Philadelphia includes 68 of these properties and districts, including 5 National Historic Landmarks; the city's remaining properties and districts are listed elsewhere. Two sites are split between West Philadelphia and other parts of the city, and are thus included on multiple lists.

Current listings

|}

See also

 List of National Historic Landmarks in Philadelphia
 National Register of Historic Places listings in Philadelphia, Pennsylvania

References

Buildings and structures in Philadelphia
West Philadelphia
West Philadelphia